An empress is a female imperial monarch, or the wife of an imperial monarch; written with a capital, Empress is used as the title of an empress, placed before her name – often just the given name.

Empress or The Empress may also refer to:

Monarchy
 Empress regnant, a female monarch of an empire
 Empress consort, the wife of a reigning emperor
 Empress dowager, the widow of an emperor
 Empress mother, an empress dowager who is the mother of a reigning monarch
 Empress of Japan, empress consort to the current reigning emperor

Arts and entertainment
Beatmania IIDX 16: Empress, the 16th game in the beatmania IIDX series of music video games
The Empress, a fictional pirate ship from the 2007 film Pirates of the Caribbean: At World's End
Empress (album), an album by Yemi Alade
Empress (chess), a fairy chess piece that moves as a rook or a knight
Empress (comics), a superheroine in the DC Comics universe
Empress (novel), a 2003 novel by Shan Sa
The Empress (Tarot card), a trump card from the tarot deck
The Empress (TV series), a 2022 historical drama series on the life of Empress Elisabeth of Austria
Empress of Blandings, a fictional pig in the Blandings Castle novels and stories by P. G. Wodehouse
Empress of Mijak (or simply Empress), a 2007 novel by Karen Miller

Biology
A number of brush-footed butterflies in the subfamily Apaturinae:
Empress, Sasakia funebris, in the Sasakia genus
Empress Antonia, Asterocampa celtis antonia, a subspecies of Asterocampa celtis
Empress Leilia, Asterocampa leilia, a species in the genus Asterocampa
Empress Flora, Asterocampa clyton flora, a subspecies of Asterocampa clyton
Empress Louisa, A. c. louisa, a subspecies of Asterocampa clyton
Painted empress, Apaturopsis cleochares
EMPReSS, a database of standardized phenotyping protocols used by the International Mouse Phenotyping Consortium
Empress brilliant (Heliodoxa imperatrix), a species of hummingbird in the family Trochilidae
Empress cicada (Megapomponia imperatoria), a species of cicada from Southeast Asia
Empress tree (Paulownia tomentosa), a deciduous tree native to central and western China

Places
Empress, Alberta, a village, Canada
Empress, Georgia, an unincorporated community, United States
The Empress (hotel), Victoria, British Columbia, Canada

Ships
American Empress (formerly Empress of the North), a stern-wheel cruise ship in the Pacific Northwest of the United States
, more than one ship of the British Royal Navy
MS Empress, a cruise ship operated by Pullmantur Cruises, formerly named Nordic Empress and Empress of the Seas
MS Empress of Australia, a Bass Strait ferry
, an ocean liner built in 1912–1913 in Scotland for Canadian Pacific Steamships
, an ocean liner built in 1913–1919 in Germany for the Hamburg America Line
, a list of Canadian Pacific Steamship Company ocean liners
, a list of ships of the Canadian Pacific Steamship Company
, ocean liner built in 1890–1891 in Barrow, England for Canadian Pacific Steamships
RMS Empress of Ireland, an English ocean liner, sank in 1914 in the Saint Lawrence River, Canada
, a United States Navy passenger barge in service briefly during 1917

Other uses
Empress (cracker), video game cracker
Empress (provincial electoral district), Alberta, Canada
Empress Embedded Database, a commercial relational database software
A former call sign for Canadian North airline
A call sign for Canadian Pacific Air Lines

See also
La Emperatriz, an album by Rigoberta Bandini
Empress Springs, a place in Western Australia
Empress Theatre (disambiguation)

Animal common name disambiguation pages